The Pearl Spring is a culturally significant artesian karst spring located in the city of Jinan, 
Shandong Province, China. The Pearl 
Spring is located on the bottom of in a square spring pool that is 
surrounded by a stone fence on all sides. The water flows off through 
a canal into the Daming Lake. The spring was incorporated into the 
garden of a governor in the year 1466 and the provincial government 
continued to reside in vicinity of the spring until the 19th century 
. The name of the 
spring is said to be related to the bubbles forming in the spring.

Spring group
Other springs in the Pearl Spring group are:
Sanshui Spring
Brook Pavilion Spring
Chu Spring

Location
The Pearl Spring is located near the center of the old part of the 
city of Jinan to the south of the Daming Lake. Its street address 
is 1 Yuanqian Avenue, Jinan, Shandong, China.

See also
List of sites in Jinan

References

Bodies of water of Shandong
Springs of China